Gooseberry Beach is a beach located in Newport, Rhode Island off Ocean Drive. It is a private beach, but also open to the public. The beach is located between Bailey's Beach and Hazard's Beach. 

Gooseberry itself is nestled in a sort of cove, protected by a spit of land and several large boulders roughly 75 metres offshore at high tide, no more than 50 at low tide.

References

Beaches of Rhode Island
Geography of Newport, Rhode Island
Landforms of Newport County, Rhode Island
Tourist attractions in Newport, Rhode Island